In finance, a failure to deliver (also FTD, plural: fails-to-deliver or FTDs) is the inability of a party to deliver a tradable asset, or meet a contractual obligation. A typical example is the failure to deliver is when a purchaser of an security does not have the cash, or shares as part of a short transaction. The Securities and Exchange Commission publishes "fails-to-deliver" data regarding transactions in the United States.

As a remedy for this in the United States, Regulation SHO was designed. Stocks bought and sold in transaction must be settled within 2 days. The buyer must deliver the cash and the seller the stock. If either party fails, a failure-to-deliver takes place. Sometimes deliberate fails-to-deliver are used to profit from falling stocks (see Bear market), so that the stock can later be purchased at a lower price, then delivered, e.g. in the week of March 10, 2008, just before the failure of Bear Stearns, the fails-to-deliver increased by 10,800 percent.

According to CNN in the US markets, fails-to-deliver had reached $200 billion a day in September 2011, but no similar data has been available for Europe.

A study of fails to deliver, published in the Journal of Financial Economics in 2014, found no evidence that FTDs "caused price distortions or the failure of financial firms during the 2008 financial crisis." Researchers studied 1,492 New York Stock Exchange stocks over a 42-month period from 2005 to 2008, and found that "greater FTDs lead to higher liquidity and pricing efficiency, and their impact is similar to our estimate of delivered short sales."

A 2016 Journal of Empirical Finance study broader in scope than that by Fotak, et al., found that indeed pricing abnormalities of Russell 3000 stocks with high delivery failures can be attributed to the market distorting effect of the sustained fails.

As part of the research effort for HBO Max docu-series Gaming Wall Street, the production company Prodigium Pictures built a SEC FTD data scraping tool to ingest all files of the SEC Fails-to-Deliver website into a central database, and published its findings, the aggregated data as of February 2022, as well as the tool itself under an Open source license via GitHub.

References

Financial markets